Grimmeodendron jamaicense is a species of plant in the family Euphorbiaceae. It is endemic to Jamaica.

References

Hippomaneae
Flora of Jamaica
Vulnerable plants
Endemic flora of Jamaica
Taxonomy articles created by Polbot